Demand Justice is a politically progressive American 501(c)(4) legal advocacy organization. It focuses on motivating left-leaning voters based on its goal of changing the composition of the American federal judiciary, as well as encouraging the United States Senate to confirm progressive nominees to judicial positions and to expand the United States Supreme Court. It was established in 2018 by Brian Fallon and Christopher Kang, originally as a project of the Sixteen Thirty Fund. In May 2021, when Demand Justice split off from the Sixteen Thirty Fund to become a separate organization, Axios described Demand Justice as the "tip of the progressive spear in battles over the makeup of the federal judiciary."

Among its first major activities after being founded in 2018 was its extensive spending on television ads opposing the confirmation of Brett Kavanaugh to the Supreme Court. It also spent $1 million on an ad campaign supporting the confirmation of Ketanji Brown Jackson after running a public campaign encouraging Stephen Breyer to retire from the Supreme Court. Multiple Republican Senators cited Demand Justice's support of Jackson as evidence that she supports packing the Supreme Court, despite her refusal to say whether she supports such a move.

References

External links

501(c)(4) nonprofit organizations
Progressive organizations in the United States
Non-profit organizations based in Washington, D.C.
2018 establishments in Washington, D.C.
Organizations established in 2018
Judicial activism
Legal advocacy organizations in the United States